Gukjo of Goryeo was believed to be the great-grandfather of Wang Geon, founder of the Goryeo dynasty. In around 918, he was Posthumously honoured as King Wondeok the Great.

Biography
According to Pyeonnyeon-Tong-Long (:ko:편년통록) and Goryeosa jeolyo (:ko:고려사절요), Gukjo was Gang Bo Yuk.

Gang Chung was a son of Gang Ho-gyeong who was the 67th descendant of Gang Hou. Gang Hou was the second child of Gang Shu who was from Zingzhao country, Shangxi province in China. He had three children named as I-Jegeon, Bo-Seung and Gang Bo Yuk. Gang Bo Yuk married with his niece Gang Deju and their daughter Gang Sin-ui was born. Gang Sin-ui married with Chinese man and King Uijo of Goryeo was born. The father of King Uijo was royal family from Tang dynasty, China. According to Pyeonnyeon-Tong-Long and Goryeosa jeolyo, he was Emperor Suzong of Tang. In Pyeonnyeongangmog, Emperor Xuānzong of Tang was father of King Uijo. When his father visited Silla, King Uijo of Goryeo was born between his Chinese father and Gang Sin-ui who was a daughter of Gang Bo Yuk. On the way of finding his father to China, King Uijo met Queen Wonchang and get married with her. According to Record of Seongwon, Queen Wonchang was a daughter of Tou En Dian Jiao Gan from Ping state (:zh:平州刺史部), China. Queen Wonchang gave birth of a boy. His name was Wang Ryung and his son was the founder of Goryeo, Taejo of Goryeo.

References

Sources

Goryeo rulers